Sun-3 is a series of UNIX computer workstations and servers produced by Sun Microsystems, launched on September 9, 1985. The Sun-3 series are VMEbus-based systems similar to some of the earlier Sun-2 series, but using the Motorola 68020 microprocessor, in combination with the Motorola 68881 floating-point co-processor (optional on the Sun 3/50) and a proprietary Sun MMU. Sun-3 systems were supported in SunOS versions 3.0 to 4.1.1_U1 and also have current support in NetBSD and Linux.

Sun-3 models 
Models are listed in approximately chronological order.

{| class="wikitable"
!Model
!Codename
!CPU board
!CPU MHz
!Max. RAM
!Chassis
|- 
| 3/75
| Carrera
| Sun 3004
| 16.67 MHz
| 8 MB
| 2-slot VME (desktop)
|- 
| 3/140
| Carrera
| Sun 3004
| 16.67 MHz
| 16 MB
| 3-slot VME (desktop/side)
|- 
| 3/160
| Carrera
| Sun 3004
| 16.67 MHz
| 16 MB
| 12-slot VME (deskside)
|- 
| 3/180
| Carrera
| Sun 3004
| 16.67 MHz
| 16 MB
| 12-slot VME (rackmount)
|- 
| 3/150
| Carrera
| Sun 3004
| 16.67 MHz
| 16 MB
| 6-slot VME (deskside)
|- 
| 3/50
| Model 25
| —
| 15.7 MHz
| 4 MB
| "wide Pizza-box" desktop
|- 
| 3/110
| Prism
| —
| 16.67 MHz
| 12 MB
| 3-slot VME (desktop/side)
|- 
| 3/260
| Sirius
| Sun 3200
| 25 MHz (CPU), 20 MHz (FPU)
| 32 MB
| 12-slot VME (deskside)
|- 
| 3/280
| Sirius
| Sun 3200
| 25 MHz (CPU), 20 MHz (FPU)
| 32 MB
| 12-slot VME (rackmount)
|- 
| 3/60
| Ferrari
| —
| 20 MHz
| 24 MB
| "wide Pizza-box" desktop
|- 
| 3/E
| Polaris
| Sun 3/E
| 20 MHz
| 16 MB
| none (6U VME board)
|}

(Max. RAM sizes may be greater when third-party memory boards are used.)

Keyboard 
The Sun Type 3 keyboard is split into three blocks:

 special keys
 main block
 numeric pad

It shipped with Sun-3 systems.

Sun-3x 

In 1989, coincident with the launch of the SPARCstation 1, Sun launched three new Sun-3 models, the 3/80, 3/470 and 3/480. Unlike previous Sun-3s, these use a Motorola 68030 processor, 68882 floating-point unit, and the 68030's integral MMU. This 68030-based architecture is called Sun-3x.

{| class="wikitable"
!Model
!Codename
!CPU board
!CPU MHz
!Max. RAM
!Chassis
|- 
| 3/80
| Hydra
| -
| 20 MHz
| 16, 40 or 64 MB
| "Pizza-box" desktop
|- 
| 3/460
| Pegasus
| Sun 3400
| 33 MHz
| 128 MB
| 12-slot VME (deskside, older design)
|- 
| 3/470
| Pegasus
| Sun 3400
| 33 MHz
| 128 MB
| 12-slot VME (deskside, newer design )
|-
| 3/480
| Pegasus
| Sun 3400
| 33 MHz
| 128 MB
| 12-slot VME (rackmount)
|}

Sun 3/260s upgraded with Sun 3400 CPU boards are known as Sun 3/460s.

See also
 Sun-1
 Sun-2
 Sun386i
 Sun-4
 SPARCstation

References

External links
 Sun Microsystems
 The Sun Hardware Reference, Part 1
 Sun Field Engineer Handbook, 20th edition 
 Obsolyte!—Fan site for old Unix Workstations, including Sun machines

68k-based computers
Computer-related introductions in 1985
Sun servers
Sun workstations
32-bit computers